Longum may refer to:

People
 Leif Longum (1927–1997), a Norwegian essayist and literary researcher

Places
Longum, Agder, a village in Arendal municipality in Agder county, Norway

Science
Longum means "long" in Latin, so it has been used in the scientific names of several living things:
Bifidobacterium longum, a type of bacteria of the human digestive system
Glottiphyllum longum, a species of succulent plant 
Piper longum, a flowering vine also known as Indian long pepper
Methylobacterium longum, a facultative methylotrophy bacteria
Xanthophyllum longum, a tree in the family Polygalaceae

Other
Longum is type of syllable weight in poetry